Alfajayucan (Otomi: Nxamti) is a town and one of the 84 municipalities of Hidalgo, in central-eastern Mexico. The municipal seat lies at Alfajayucan. The municipality covers an area of 467.7 km².

As of 2005, the municipality had a total population of 16,859. In 2017 there were 4,342 inhabitants who spoke an indigenous language, primarily Mezquital Otomi.

Xamaje is a section of Afajayucan, Hidalgo, Mexico

References

Municipalities of Hidalgo (state)
Populated places in Hidalgo (state)